Lloyd Reid George (October 23, 1925 – February 25, 2012) was an American politician.

George was a mayor of Danville, Arkansas and then served in the Arkansas House of Representatives 1963-1967 and 1973–1997. A son, Nathan V. George, was also a state representative.

George was well known for wearing overalls on the last day of the legislative session to mark his return from the legislature to his farm.

Notes

1925 births
2012 deaths
Mayors of places in Arkansas
Members of the Arkansas House of Representatives
People from Danville, Arkansas